Gbangbossou is a village in central Ivory Coast. It is in the sub-prefecture of Tié-N'Diékro, Didiévi Department, Bélier Region, Lacs District.

Until 2012, Gbangbossou was in the commune of N'Gban-Kassê with the nearby villages of Niénékro and Agbakro. In March 2012, N'Gban-Kassê became one of 1126 communes nationwide that were abolished.

Notes

Populated places in Lacs District
Populated places in Bélier